Yerofey Khabarov class motorship is a class of Russian river passenger ships. It is named after Yerofey Khabarov.

Two-deck cargo-passenger ships built in the Soviet Union, 1959–1963.

References

External links

River cruise ships
Ships of Russia
Ships of the Soviet Union